The Ministry of Unladylike Activity is the first book in a new children's mystery fiction series by British-American author Robin Stevens.

Plot

The book is set in 1940, at the start of World War II, and the British government is setting up a secret agency to train spies, called the Ministry of Unladylike Activity. The protagonists are three new detectives from different backgrounds who find themselves caught up in two murders.

Reception
The book has won several accolades including:
  
 Sunday Times Children's Book of the Week
 Blackwell's Children's Book of the Year 2022
 One of Waterstones' Best Children's Books of 2022
 One of the Daily Mail's choice of 2022's children's books
 One of the Irish Times' children's books of 2022
 One of the Guardian's best children's books of 2022

References

Children's novels
Puffin Books books